Kuo Chin-fa (1 March 1944 – 8 October 2016) was a Taiwanese singer.

His best-known work, a rerecording of the song "Hot Rice Dumpling," was released in 1959. Shortly after the original was released in 1949, the Kuomintang had begun censorship of Taiwanese Hokkien, limiting Hokkien pop on the airwaves, and banning performances of "Hot Rice Dumpling." Kuo's popularity rose during the 1960s, and lasted throughout his career, which spanned over 100 albums. The Chinese Taipei national baseball team used "Hot Rice Dumpling" as its theme song at the 2006 Asian Games.

While performing in Fengshan, Kaohsiung on 8 October 2016, Kuo collapsed on stage and was taken to Kaohsiung Armed Forces General Hospital, where he was declared dead. The next day, the Kaohsiung District Prosecutors' Office announced that Kuo had died of cardiorespiratory failure.

References

External links

1944 births
2016 deaths
Taiwanese Hokkien pop singers
Taiwanese people of Hoklo descent
Musicians from Taipei
Musicians who died on stage